Dan Swimer (born 1972 in Manchester) is a British television writer, producer, consultant and associate. He has produced episodes of Popworld, Lily Allen and Friends, and Sacha Baron Cohen's Who Is America?. He wrote material for Never Mind the Buzzcocks, How TV Ruined Your Life and Stand Up for the Week. He and Simon Amstell wrote Grandma's House.  He has worked on You Have Been Watching and Ask Rhod Gilbert and has written for BBC Three show, Crims. He has two children.

References

External links 
 

1972 births
Living people
British television producers
British television writers
21st-century English writers
Writers from Manchester
People educated at Manchester Grammar School